Luis Hernán Álvarez Hernández (21 May 1938 – 23 January 1991) was a Chilean footballer who played in clubs in Chile and El Salvador.

Teams
 Colo-Colo 1958-1965
 Magallanes 1966
 Alianza 1967
 Green Cross Temuco 1968
 Antofagasta Portuario 1969

Personal life
He was born and died in Curicó, Chile.

He was the father of the twin brothers Cristián and Iván, who were professional footballers and coincided at both Chile U17 and Universidad Católica.

Post retirement

Late 1980s, he founded the Escuela Municipal de Fútbol de Curicó (Municipal Football Academy of Curicó), later named Juventud 2000 (Youth 2000), a football academy what has been the breeding ground of successful footballers such as his sons Cristián and Iván, Claudio Maldonado and Patricio Ormazábal. He worked as coach of the Academy until his death in 1991.

The ANFA Stadium in Curicó was given the name of Luis Hernán Álvarez in his honor.

Titles
Colo Colo
 Chilean Primera División (2): 1960, 1963
 Copa Chile (1): 1958

Alianza
 Salvadoran Primera División (1): 1966–67

Honours
 Chilean Primera División Top Goalscorer: 1963

References

External links
 
 Luis Hernán Álvarez at PartidosdelaRoja (in Spanish)

1938 births
1991 deaths
People from Curicó
Chilean footballers
Chilean expatriate footballers
Chile international footballers
Colo-Colo footballers
Deportes Magallanes footballers
Magallanes footballers
Alianza F.C. footballers
Club de Deportes Green Cross footballers
Deportes Temuco footballers
C.D. Antofagasta footballers
Chilean Primera División players
Salvadoran Primera División players
Chilean expatriate sportspeople in El Salvador
Expatriate footballers in El Salvador
Association football forwards
Chilean football managers
Curicó Unido managers
Primera B de Chile managers